Nayapati is a village and former Village Development Committee that is now part of Gokarneshwar Municipality in Kathmandu District in Province No. 3 of central Nepal. At the time of the 1991 Nepal census it had a population of 4,056 living in 761 households.

References

The first ever electedchairman of nayapati vdc was Mr. Jayaram Thapa. He was from Nepali congress party.

Populated places in Kathmandu District